James Edward Gunn (August 22, 1920, San Francisco, California – September 22, 1966, Los Angeles, California) was an American film and television screenwriter and producer. He attended Stanford University.

His credits include Affair in Trinidad, The Young Philadelphians, The Unfaithful, Over-Exposed, Man from 1997 on the television series Conflict, and Because They're Young. Gunn was born in San Francisco in 1920 and was known for his work in hardboiled fiction and crime stories, including the TV detective series 77 Sunset Strip, Checkmate, and Mickey Spillane's Mike Hammer. Earlier, in 1947, RKO Pictures released its  controversial crime drama Born to Kill, which was based on Gunn's 1943 work Deadlier Than the Male, his only published novel. He died in Los Angeles in 1966 at the age of 46. James Gunn also created a pilot for a Western series called "Mountain Man", which portrayed the activities and adventures surrounding a Rocky Mountain fur trading station in the 1840s.

References

External links

Film producers from California
American male screenwriters
Writers from San Francisco
1920 births
1966 deaths
20th-century American businesspeople
Screenwriters from California
20th-century American male writers
20th-century American screenwriters